The 2019  Bracknell Forest Borough Council election took place on 2 May 2019 to elect all 42 councillors in 18 wards for Bracknell Forest Borough Council in England.

The Conservative Party has controlled the council since its establishment as a unitary authority in 1997, and ended up securing a seventh term in office.

Background 
Bracknell Forest Borough Council held local elections on 2 May 2019 along with councils across England as part of the 2019 local elections. The council elects its members in all-out elections, with all its councillors up for election every four years. Councillors defending their seats in this election were previously elected in 2015. In that election, forty-one Conservative councillors and one Labour councillor were elected.

The council has been controlled by the Conservative Party since the unitary authority was first elected in 1997. The predecessor district council had been controlled by both the Labour and Conservative parties.

Overall results
After the previous election, and immediately before this election, the composition of the council was:

The Conservatives held the council losing just three seats with two going to Labour and one to the Liberal Democrats.

Following the 2019 election, the composition of the council was:

Ward results
An asterisk (*) denotes an incumbent councillor standing for re-election

Ascot

Binfield with Warfield

Bullbrook

Central Sandhurst

College Town

Crown Wood

Crowthorne

Great Hollands North

Great Hollands South

Hanworth

Harmans Water

Little Sandhurst and Wellington

Old Bracknell

Owlsmoor

Priestwood and Garth

Warfield Harvest Ride

Wildridings & Central

Winkfield & Cranbourne

By-elections

Old Bracknell

References

2019 English local elections
2019
2010s in Berkshire
May 2019 events in the United Kingdom